Serena Armitage is a director and producer from North Yorkshire, UK. She is best known for producing the short film Stutterer that earned her an Academy Award for Best Live Action Short Film at the 88th Academy Awards with director Benjamin Cleary.

Filmography

Flux Gourmet
Stutterer
The Birth Of Valerie Venus (film)
FOG(film)
 Paul O'Grady: For the Love of Dogs
 Come Dine with Me 
 Piers Morgan's Life Stories

References

External links
 

Irish film directors
Irish film producers
Living people
Year of birth missing (living people)
Irish women film directors
Irish women film producers